Ngot Peter Mou Athuai   Slate Nation is a South Sudanese-born Australia-based musician, artist and songwriter. He was born in Thiet, a suburb of Tonj State.

Music career

Slate Nation began his music career in 2007 as a choir member in Don Bosco Missionary School in his hometown Tonj. He made his breakthrough with his hit song Juba Juice in 2016. He has collaborated with international acts such as Skales, Pallaso, Jose Chameleone. The artist undertook his second tour of Australia in late 2017. He worked on his fourth studio album expected in 2023, which features work by Chameleone, Skales, Tekno (musician) and Emmanuel Jal. At the beginning of 2022, Slate Nation conducted a world music tour with Rema of Marvin, Kizz Daniel, KiDi.

Personal life

In 2017, while touring Australia, Slate Nation claimed that his life was in danger if he returned to South Sudan. In 2018 December his brother Magontong died in a road accident near Tonj.

Discography

Studio albums

Songs
{| class="wikitable"
|+Songs
!Song Title
!Year
|-
|Come Back Home
|2010
|-
|Juba Juice
|2015
|-
|Nyanbim
|2016
|-
|Girls Dem Hotter Ft. Captain Dollar
|2016
|-
|Anatabani
|2017
|-
|Yiith
|2017
|-
|Panda Awiel
|2017
|-
|Mading Bor
|2017
|-
|Dom Achin
|2017
|-
|Take Me Down
|2017
|-
|Maath
|2017
|-
|Yitok
|2017
|-
|Wuong
|2017
|-
|Pandum
|2017
|-
|Piir
|2017
|-
|Nya Adai
|2017
|-
|Piandu
|2017
|-
|Good Girl
|2017
|-
|Domachin
|2018
|-
|Nya Adai
|2018
|-
|Chut Angueem
|2018
|-
|Beautiful Girl Ft Pallaso
|2019
|-
|Take Me Down
|2019
|-
|Panda Awiel
|2019
|-
|Mading Bor
|2019
|-
|Inu
|2020

Awards

See also
 Hardlife Avenue Stars
 Ragga jungle

References

External links
 Slate Nation Official Website
 https://www.galaxyfm.co.ug/2022/07/18/slate-nation-performs-on-the-global-stage-in-australia/
 https://www.sudanspost.com/slate-nation-left-fans-craving-at-melbourne-concert-with-nigerian-singer-rema/

Living people
South Sudanese musicians
South Sudanese singers
South Sudanese men
People from Juba
South Sudanese emigrants to Australia
South Sudanese songwriters
South Sudanese culture
South Sudanese singer-songwriters
Year of birth missing (living people)
South Sudanese emigrants